Kevin D. Jeffries (born November 24, 1964) is an American politician from the State of California. He is a Riverside County Supervisor and a former member of the California State Assembly representing the California's 66th Assembly district. Jeffries is a member of the Republican Party.

Prior to his election, Jeffries served seven years as chairman of the Republican Party of Riverside County, California and served as a delegate to the California Republican Party and its executive committee, platform committee and County Chairmen's Association.

On October 1, 2021, Jeffries announced that he would not seek reelection in 2024 and would retire from public office after his term ends.

He lives in Lake Elsinore, California with his wife, he has two adult children.

Election history

Riverside County Board of Supervisors, District 1

California State Assembly, District 66

Notable achievements
He is responsible for Old Highway 395 being declared historic.

References

External links
Campaign Website
Join California Kevin Jeffries

1964 births
Living people
American investors
County supervisors in California
Republican Party members of the California State Assembly
People from Downey, California
People from Lake Elsinore, California
21st-century American politicians